Titer Khel is a Marwat village on the Indus Highway in Khyber Pakhtunkhwa, Pakistan.

Topology
Titer Khel is surrounded by sand dunes.

Populated places in Khyber Pakhtunkhwa